Leon Jenkins (born August 18, 1950 in Columbus, Ohio) is a former defensive back in the NFL. He played for the Detroit Lions. He was drafted in the 1972 NFL Draft out of West Virginia.

External links
https://web.archive.org/web/20070216124913/http://www.databasefootball.com/players/playerpage.htm?ilkid=JENKILEO01

1950 births
Living people
West Virginia Mountaineers football players
American football running backs
Detroit Lions players